ROCS Lo Yang (DD-14) may refer to one of the following destroyers of the Republic of China Navy:

 , the former American  USS Benson (DD-421) launched in November 1939; acquired by the Republic of China Navy in February 1954; struck in 1975 and scrapped
 , the former American  USS Taussig (DD-746) launched in January 1944; acquired by the Republic of China Navy in May 1974; later reclassified as DD-949; decommissioned in 2000 and was planned to be displayed as a museum ship in the Republic of China

Lo Yang